Youcef Reguigui (born 9 January 1990) is an Algerian road racing cyclist, who currently rides for UCI Continental team .

He began his professional career with the African  team in 2013. His first professional win came in 2014 at the 2.1-ranked Tour d'Azerbaïdjan. The following year, he won his second professional victory at the summit finish of Fraser's Hill in the 2015 Tour de Langkawi. He was named in the start list for the 2015 Vuelta a España.

Major results

2011
 1st  Road race, National Road Championships
 1st  Road race, National Under-23 Road Championships
 1st Stage 7 Tour du Faso
 Challenge du Prince
2nd Trophée de la Maison Royale
3rd Trophée de l'Anniversaire
 3rd  Road race, Pan Arab Games
 3rd ZLM Tour
 5th Road race, African Road Championships
 7th Overall Tour d'Algérie
1st Stage 3
2012
 1st  Overall Tour d'Azerbaïdjan
 1st Stage 2 Toscana-Terra di Ciclismo
 3rd Road race, National Road Championships
 8th La Côte Picarde
2013
 1st  Road race, Arab Road Championships
 2nd Overall Sharjah International Cycling Tour
1st Stage 4
2014
 1st Stage 2 Tour de Chlef
 1st Stage 3 Tour d'Azerbaïdjan
2015
 1st  Overall Tour de Langkawi
1st Stage 7
2016
 2nd  Road race, African Road Championships
 7th Trofeo Playa de Palma
2017
 National Road Championships
1st  Road race
2nd Time trial
 1st  Overall Tour de Blida
2018
 1st  Road race, National Road Championships
 Tour du Sénégal
1st Points classification
1st Stages 2, 3 & 4
 Tour International des Zibans
1st Stages 2 & 4
 African Road Championships
3rd  Team time trial
8th Road race
 4th Overall Grand Prix International de la ville d'Alger
1st Stage 2
 5th Overall Tour d'Algérie
1st  Points classification
1st Stages 4, 5 & 7
 7th Overall La Tropicale Amissa Bongo
 7th Grand Prix de la Pharmacie Centrale
 10th Overall Tour de la Pharmacie Centrale
1st Stage 1
2019
 1st  Road race, African Games
 National Road Championships
1st  Time trial
4th Road race
 Challenge du Prince
1st Trophée de l'Anniversaire
1st Trophée de la Maison Royale
4th Trophée Princier
 1st Points classification Tour of China II
 3rd  Road race, African Road Championships
 3rd Overall Tour de Kumano
 3rd Overall Tour of Iran (Azerbaijan)
1st Stage 2
 4th Overall Tour de Korea
1st  Points classification
 4th Overall La Tropicale Amissa Bongo
2020
 National Road Championships
1st  Time trial
4th Road race
 4th Overall La Tropicale Amissa Bongo
1st Stage 5 
 4th Overall Tour of Saudi Arabia
 6th Overall Tour de Taiwan
2021
 African Road Championships
3rd  Road race
3rd  Team time trial
 6th Grand Prix Gazipaşa
 7th GP Manavgat
2022
 2nd  Road race, Islamic Solidarity Games
 6th Grand Prix Develi
 7th Grand Prix Erciyes
 10th Road race, Mediterranean Games

Grand Tour general classification results timeline

References

External links

1990 births
Living people
Algerian male cyclists
Cyclists at the 2016 Summer Olympics
Olympic cyclists of Algeria
Competitors at the 2018 Mediterranean Games
African Games medalists in cycling
African Games gold medalists for Algeria
Competitors at the 2019 African Games
Mediterranean Games competitors for Algeria
21st-century Algerian people
Competitors at the 2022 Mediterranean Games